Nationality words link to articles with information on the nation's poetry or literature (for instance, Irish or France).

Events
 March 23 – German-born writer Assia Wevill, a mistress of English poet Ted Hughes (and ex-wife of Canadian poet David Wevill), gasses herself and their daughter at her London home.
 FIELD magazine founded at Oberlin College.
 Charles Bukowski quits his day job as a Post Office clerk in Los Angeles to embark on a writing career after being promised a $100 stipend from Black Sparrow Press. He said at the time: "I have one of two choices — stay in the post office and go crazy ... or stay out here and play at writer and starve. I decided to starve."
 Howard Nemerov named Edward Mallinckrodt Distringuished University Professor of English and Distinguished Poet in Residence at Washington University in St. Louis, posts which he will hold until his death in 1991.
 The Kenyon Review is closed by Kenyon College after 30 years; it will be restarted by the college in 1979
 Sir Arthur Bliss writes a cantata "The world is charged with the grandeur of God", from Gerard Manley Hopkins' sonnet of the same first line.
 Louise Bogan retires after 38 years as poetry critic for The New Yorker.
 Tish literary magazine, founded in Vancouver, British Columbia, Canada, in 1961 and published intermittently thereafter, prints its last issue. Poets associated with the magazine included Frank Davey, Fred Wah, George Bowering, and, briefly, bpNichol when he lived in Vancouver.
 First issue of poetry magazine The Lace Curtain founded and edited by Michael Smith and Trevor Joyce under their New Writers Press imprint in Dublin. It will publish six issues until 1978
 Alexander Tvardovsky, editor of Novy Mir, a Soviet literary magazine, is under attack this year and threatened with dismissal for "spreading cosmopolitan ideas", for "mocking the Soviet peoples' most sacred feelings" and for "denigrating Soviet patriotism". He responds that he was the "real patriot" and was opposed to "reactionary, nationalistic, neo-Slavophil" literary currents

Works published in English
Listed by nation where the work was first published and again by the poet's native land, if different; substantially revised works listed separately:

Canada
 Milton Acorn, I've Tasted My Blood
 Earle Birney. The poems of Earle Birney: a New Canadian Library selection. (New Canadian library original N06.) Toronto: McClelland and Stewart.
 George Bowering, The Gangs of Kosmos
 Phyllis Gotlieb, Ordinary, Moving
 Ralph Gustafson, Ixion's Wheel
 Irving Layton, Selected Poems. Wynne Francis ed. Toronto: McClelland and Stewart.
 Irving Layton, The Whole Bloody Bird: Obs, Aphs & Pomes. Toronto: McClelland and Stewart.
 Gwendolyn MacEwen, The Shadow Maker
 Tom Marshall, The Silences of Fire
 Alden Nowlan, The Mysterious Naked Man
 Michael Ondaatje, The Man with Seven Toes, Toronto: Coach House Press
 Raymond Souster, So Far So Good: Poems, 1938/1968. Ottawa: Oberon Press.
 Miriam Waddington, Say Yes

India, in English

 P. Lal, editor, Modern Indian Poetry in English: An Anthology and Credo, Calcutta, Writers Workshop, India, anthology (second, expanded edition, 1971, however, on page 597 of the second edition, an "editor's note" states contents "on the following pages are a supplement to the first edition" and is dated "1972")
 Daisy Aldan, editor, Poems of India; New York, United States.

United Kingdom
 W. H. Auden, City Without Walls
 Alan Bold, A Perpetual Motion Machine
 Alan Brownjohn, Sandgrains on a Tray
 Basil Bunting, Collected Poems
 Charles Causley, Figure of 8
 Barry Cole, Moonsearch
 Donald Davies, Essex Poems 1963–67
 Douglas Dunn, Terry Street
 James Fenton, Put Thou Thy Tears Into My Bottle, poetry
 Padraic Fiacc, Northern Irish poet published in the United Kingdom:
 By the Black Stream
 (edited) The Wearing of the Black
 Roy Fisher, Collected Poems
 Thom Gunn, Poems 1950–1966
 David Harsent, A Violent Country
 Seamus Heaney, Northern Irish poet published in the United Kingdom:
 Door into the Dark, Faber & Faber
 A Lough Neagh Sequence, Phoenix
 Adrian Henri, Tonight at Noon
 John Hewitt, Northern Irish poet published in the United Kingdom, Collected Poems, 1932-1967
 Molly Holden, To Make me Grieve
 Anselm Hollo, The Coherences
 Elizabeth Jennings, The Animals' Arrival
 Tom Leonard, Scottish dialect poet, Six Glasgow Poems
 Laurence Lerner, Selves
 Christopher Logue
 New Numbers
 The Girls
 Michael Longley, No Continuing City
 Hugh MacDiarmid, pen name of Christopher Murray Grieve, A Clyack-Sheaf
 Roger McGough, Watchwords
 Brian Patten, Notes to the Hurrying Man
 J. H. Prynne, The White Stones
 Iain Crichton Smith, From Bourgeois Land
 Jon Stallworthy, Root and Branch
 Edward Storey, North Bank Night
 David Sutton, Out on a Limb
 Charles Tomlinson, The Way of a World
 Sydney Tremayne, The Turning Sky
 Vernon Watkins, Uncollected Poems, introduction by Kathleen Raine; Welsh poet, posthumous
 Kenneth White, translator, Selected Poems, translated from the original French of André Breton; publisher: Jonathan Cape

Children of Albion poetry anthology
Children of Albion: Poetry of the Underground in Britain, edited by Michael Horovitz, was the first anthology to present a wide-ranging selection of the new British Poetry Revival movement. Poems from these writers were included in it:

 John Arden
 Peter Armstrong
 Pete Brown
 Jim Burns
 Johnny Byrne
 Charles Cameron
 David Chaloner
 Barry Cole
 John Cotton
 Andrew Crozier
 Dave Cunliffe
 Felix de Mendelssohn
 Raymond Durgnat

 Paul Evans
 Ian Hamilton Finlay
 Roy Fisher
 Harry Guest
 Lee Harwood
 Michael Hastings
 Spike Hawkins
 Geoffrey Hazard
 Piero Heliczer
 Pete Hoida
 Anselm Hollo
 Frances Horovitz
 Michael Horovitz

 Libby Houston
 Mark Hyatt
 John James
 Roger Jones
 David Kerrison
 Seymour King
 Bernard Kops
 David Kozubei
 Herbert Lomas
 Anna Lovell
 Paul Matthews
 Michael McCafferty
 John McGrath

 Tom McGrath
 Stuart Mills
 Ted Milton
 Adrian Mitchell
 Edwin Morgan
 Tina Morris
 Philip O'Connor
 Neil Oram
 Tom Pickard
 Paul Potts
 Tom Raworth
 Carlyle Reedy

 Bernard Saint
 Michael Shayer
 David Sladen
 Tom Taylor
 Barry Tebb
 Chris Torrance
 Alexander Trocchi
 Gael Turnbull
 Patrick Waites
 Nicholas Snowden Willey
 William Wyatt
 Michael X

United States
 W. H. Auden, City without Walls
 Ted Berrigan, Peace: Broadside
 John Berryman:
 The Dream Songs (New York: Farrar, Straus & Giroux)
 His Toy, His Dream His Rest (New York: Farrar, Straus & Giroux)
 Elizabeth Bishop, The Complete Poems (Farrar, Straus, and Giroux)
 Paul Blackburn, Two New Poems
 Louise Bogan, The Blue Estuaries
 Lucille Clifton, Good Times, selected as one of the year's best books by The New York Times
 Robert Creeley, Pieces
 Ed Dorn:
 Gunslinger: Book II, Black Sparrow Press
 The Midwest Is That Space Between the Buffalo Statler and the Lawrence Eldridge, T. Williams
 The Cosmology of Finding Your Spot, Cottonwood
 Twenty-four Love Songs, Frontier Press
 Ed Dorn and Gordon Brotherston, translators, Jose Emilio Pacheco, Tree Between Two Walls, Black Sparrow Press
 LeRoi Jones, editor, Black Magic: Poetry, 1961-1967
 Hugh Kenner,  The Invisible Poet: T. S. Eliot (revised from the 1959 edition), Canadian writing and published in the United States (criticism)
 James Merrill, The Fire Screen
 W. S. Merwin:
 Animae, San Francisco: Kayak
 Translator, Transparence of the World, poems by Jean Follain, New York: Atheneum (reprinted in 2003, Port Townsend, Washington: Copper Canyon Press)
 Translator, Twenty Love Poems and a Song of Despair by Pablo Neruda; London: Cape (reprinted in 2004 with an introduction by Christina Garcia, New York: Penguin Books)
 Translator, Voices: Selected Writings of Antonio Porchia, Chicago: Follett (reprinted in 1988 and 2003, Port Townsend, Washington: Copper Canyon Press)
 Vladimir Nabokov, Poems and Problems, 
 Lorine Niedecker, T & G: Collected Poems, 1936-1966
 Ron Padgett, Great Balls of Fire, Holt, Rinehart & Winston
 Charles Reznikoff, By the Well of Living & Seeing and The Fifth Book of the Maccabees
 Aram Saroyan, Pages, Random House
 James Schuyler, Freely Espousing
 Charles Simic, Jim Harrison, George Quasha, Dan Gerber, J.D. Reed, Five Blind Men, (Sumac Press)
 Gary Snyder, Smokey the Bear Sutra
 Louis Zukofsky, in collaboration with his wife, Celia, publishes an experimental Latin translation Catullus

Other English language
 James K. Baxter, Rock Woman, New Zealand
 Charles Brasch: Not Far Off: Poems, Christchurch: Caxton Press, New Zealand
 Edward Brathwaite, Islands, third part of his The Arrivants trilogy, which also includes Rights of Passage (1967) and Masks (1968), Caribbean
 Sam Hunt, From Bottle Creek: Selected Poems 1967–69 New Zealand
 Donagh MacDonagh, A Warning to Conquerors, Ireland
 Les Murray, The Weatherboard Cathedral, Australia
 Wole Soyinka, Poems from Prison (Nigeria)
 Derek Walcott, The Gulf, Caribbean

Works published in other languages
Listed by nation where the work was first published and again by the poet's native land, if different; substantially revised works listed separately:

French language

Canada, in French
 André Major, Poèmes pour durer
 Pierre Chatillon, Soleil de bivouac
 Jean-Guy Pilon:
 Comme Eau retenue (Paris), a republishing of all of his previous books of poems in one volume
 Saisons pour la continuelle, Paris: Seghers
 Guy Robert, five books of poems
 Jean Royer, Nos corps habitables, Sillery: Éditions de l'Arc
 André Saint-Germain, Sens unique
 Gemma Tremblay, Les Seins gorgés

France
 Louis Aragon, Les Chambres
 M. Beguey, La Rose ardente
 G. Belloni, La Route du feu
 Luc Bérimont, Un Feu vivant
 M. Berry, Isabelle
 Philippe Chabaneix, Les matins et les soirs
 René Char, La Pluie giboyeuse
 Andrée Chedid:
 Contre-chat
 Seul le Visage
 Michel Deguy, Figurations
 P. Dumaine, Inscriptions
 Jacques Dupin, L'embrasure
 Pierre Emmanuel, pen name of Noël Mathieu, Notre Père
 Gérard Genette, Figures II, one of three volumes of a work of critical scholarship in poetics – general theory of literary form and analysis of individual works — the Figures volumes are concerned with the problems of poetic discourse and narrative in Stendhal, Flaubert and Proust and in Baroque poetry (see also Figures I 1966, Figures III 1972)
 Eugene Guilleveic, Ville
 R. Houdelot, Amour en profil perdu
 Philippe Jaccottet:
 Leçons
  L'Entretien des muses, a prose account of poetry writing
 Edmond Jabès, Elya
 Michel Leiris, Note sans mémoire, Gallimard
 Loys Masson, La Croix de rose rouge (posthumous)
 Saint-John Perse, Chanté par celle qui fut là [...], Paris: privately printed by Robert Blanchet
 Raymond Queneau, Fendre les flots
 Jean-Claude Renard, La Braise et la Rivière
 S. de Ricard, Les Chemins perdus
 Robert Sabatier won the Grand Prix de Poésie for:
 Les Poisons délectables
 Les Châteaux des millions d'années

Anthologies
 Marc Alyn, editor, La Nouvelle Poésie française
 J. Loisy, editor, Un Certain Choix de poèmes

Germany
 Hilde Domin, editor, Frankfurt and Bonn: Athenaum (scholarship)
 H. Lamprecht, editor, Deutschland, Deutschland: Politische Gedichte, anthology
 Albrecht Schöne, Über politische Lyrik im 20. Jahrhundert, Vandenhoeck & Ruprecht (scholarship)

Hebrew
 P.Naveh, editor, Lol Shirai Yaakov Frances, the works of a seventeenth-century Italian Hebrew poet
 Rachel u-Michtaveha, Shirai Rachel u-Michtaveha (posthumous)
 A. Broides, Mivhar Shirim
 D. Chomsky, ba-Et u-Veona
 K. A. Bertini, Bakbuk Al Pnai ha-Mayim
 Y. Amichai, Ahshav be-Raash
 Y. Mar, Panim le-Kan (posthumous)
 D. Ravikovich, ha-Sefer ha-Shelishi
 N. Stuchkoff, compiler, Otzar ha-Safa ha-Ivrit (United States)
 G. Churgin, Ojkai Mahshava (United States)
 R. Ben-Yosef, (An American Jew living in Israel) Derech Eretz

India
Listed in alphabetical order by first name:
 Devarakonda Balagangadhara Tilak, Amrutham Kurisina ratri, ("The Night When Nectar Rained"); Telugu-language, posthumously published, it became the author's best-known work, called a "milestone in modern Telugu" by Sisir Kumar Das
 Nirendranath Chakravarti; Bengali-language:
 Kolkata,r Jishu, Kolkata: Aruna Prokashoni
 Nirendranath Chakravarti, Nokhotro Joyer Jonno, Kolkata: Surabhi Prokashoni
 Thangjam Ibopishak Singh, Apaiba Thawai ("The Hovering Soul"), Imphal: Naharol Sahitya Premee Samiti; Meitei language

Italy
 Guido Ceronetti, Poesie, frammenti, poesie separate
 Giuseppe Favati, Controbuio
 Albino Pierro, Eccò 'a morte ("Why Death?"), in the Tursi language (Lucania)

Other
 Miguel de Unamuno, edited by Roberto Paoli, Poesie, scholarly survey of his verse, with a selection of his Spanish poems with Italian translations

Norway
 Paal Brekke, editor, Norsk lyrikk nå (anthology of Norwegian poetry of the 1960s)
 Tarjei Vesaas, collected poems
 Georg Johannesen, collected poems

Poland
Edward Balcerzan – Granica na moment
Stanisław Grochowiak - Nie było lata
Zbigniew Herbert – Napis
Tadeusz Różewicz - Regio

Portuguese

Brazil
 Gregório de Matos (1633–1696), edited by James Amado, Obras Completas
 Décio Pignatari, Exercicio Findo

Portugal
 Ruy de Moura Belo, Homem de palavra[s] ("A Man of [His] Word[s]")

Russia
 Evgeni Vinokurov, Selected Poems
 Vladimir Sokolov, Snow in September
 Konstantin Vanshenkin, Experience
 Aleksandr Tvardovsky, Lyrical Poems
 Andrei Voznesensky, "I Can't Write" a poem published in Phoenix, a broadsheet newspaper
 Robert Rozhdestvenski, Poem About Different Points of View, a long poem published in Yunost

Spanish poetry

Spain
 Matilde Camus:
 Voces (Voices)
 Vuelo de estrellas (Stars flight)

Latin America

Mexico
 Octavio Paz, Ladera Este
 R. Bonifaz Nuño, El ala del tigre
 Rosario Castellanos, Materia memorable
 Carlos Pellicer, Antología
 Efraín Huerta, a collection
 M. Michelena, a collection
 M. Guardia, a collection
 Gabriel Zaid, a book of new poetry
 Homero Aridjis, a book of new poetry
 M. A. Montes de Oca, a book of new poetry
 Juan Bañuelos, a book of new poetry
 José Emilio Pacheco, a book of new poetry

Other Latin America
 Jorge Luis Borges:
 Nueva antología personal
 Elogio de las sombras
 A. Pizarnik, Extracción de la piedra de la locura
 F. Urondo, Adolecer
 Pablo Neruda, Fin de mundo
 Luis Cardoza y Aragón, Dibujos de ciego (Guatemala)
 Ernesto Cardenal, Homenaje a los indios americanos (Nicaragua)
 P. A. Cuadra, Poesía escogida (Nicaragua)
 César Velejo, Obra poética completa (Peru)
 Roque Dalton, Taberna y otros lugares (El Salvador)

Sweden
 Lars Norén, Revolver
 Majken Johansson, Omtal
 Elsa Grave, Vid nödläge
 Reidar Ekner, Andhämtning, builder

Yiddish
 Avrom Sutskever, Poems from the Dead Sea
 Chaim Grade, On My Way to You
 Moyshe Knaphcys, a new collection
 Leyb Morgentory, a new collection
 Kh. L. Fuks, a new collection
 I. Emiot, a new collection
 L. Kusman, a new collection
 J. A. Rontsh, a new collection
 M. M. Shafir, a new collection

Other Yiddish
 Poet Yankev Glatshteyn in an essay, said the poet should be a spokesman for his generation, and his poetry should be a poetry of involvement.

Other
 Inger Christensen, it (det, later translated into English by Susanna Nied); Denmark
 Syed Shamsul Haque, Boishekhe Rochito Ponktimala ("Verses of Boishakh") and Birotihin Utsob ("The ceaseless festival"), Bengali published in East Pakistan
 Kurt Marti, Leichenreden (Switzerland) in German, a collection of humorous verse variations of death notices and conventional funeral orations.
 Kirsten Thorup, Love from Trieste; Denmark

Awards and honors

Canada
 See 1969 Governor General's Awards for a complete list of winners and finalists for those awards.

United Kingdom
 Bollingen Prize: John Berryman and Karl Shapiro
 Cholmondeley Award: Derek Walcott, Tony Harrison
 Eric Gregory Award: Gavin Bantock, Jeremy Hooker, Jenny King, Neil Powell, Landeg E. White
 Queen's Gold Medal for Poetry: Stevie Smith

United States
 National Book Award for Poetry: John Berryman, His Toy, His Dream, His Rest
 Pulitzer Prize for Poetry: George Oppen: Of Being Numerous
 Fellowship of the Academy of American Poets: Richard Eberhart and Anthony Hecht

Births
 March 14 – Murray Lachlan Young, American-born British poet and performer
 March 29 – Ranjit Hoskote, Indian poet
 April 18 – C. Dale Young, American poet
 July 28 – Anthony Butts, American poet
 Stephanie Bolster, Canadian poet
 Matthias Goritz, German poet
 Hauke Huckstadt, German poet
 Davis McCombs, American poet

Deaths
Birth years link to the corresponding "[year] in poetry" article:
 February 19 – Kazimierz Wierzynski, 74, Polish poet
 March 12 – André Salmon, 87, French poet, critic and novelist
 March 25 – Max Eastman, 86, American poet and editor
 April 22 – Rolfe Humphries, 74, American poet, of emphysema
 May 4 – Sir Osbert Sitwell, 76, English writer, of a heart attack
 May 26 – Henry Rago, 53, American poet and editor of Poetry
 July 11 – Guilherme de Almeida, 78, "prince of Brazilian poetry"
 July 23 – Floyd Bell, 82, of a heart ailment
 July 27 – Vivian de Sola Pinto, 73, British poet, memoirist, literary critic and historian
 October 21 – Jack Kerouac, 47, influential American Beat Generation poet, writer and novelist, of internal hemorrhage and cirrhosis
 Also:
 Loys Masson (born 1915), French poet
 W. R. Rodgers (born 1909), Irish poet, essayist, book reviewer, radio broadcaster, script writer, lecturer, teacher and Presbyterian minister

See also

 Poetry
 List of poetry awards
 List of years in poetry

Notes

Poetry
 
20th-century poetry